The following is a list of United States colleges and universities that are either in the process of reclassifying their athletic programs to NCAA Division I, or have announced future plans to do the same.

Current reclassifications 
These schools have begun the formal Division I reclassification process.

References

NCAA Division I lists